MMPIP is a drug used in scientific research that acts as a selective antagonist for the metabotropic glutamate receptor subtype mGluR7. This receptor subtype appears to be involved in the downstream response to cocaine in the brain.

References

MGlu7 receptor antagonists